Shaarei Teshuva (lit. "Gates of Repentance") may refer to a number of texts:

 An ethical work authored by Yonah Gerondi (Rabenu Yonah) and first published in 1505.
 A commentary on the Shulchan Aruch authored by Chaim Mordechai Margoliot.
 The High Holy Day Machzor published by the Central Conference of American Rabbis for the Reform Movement in North America.
 A collection of Geonic responsa published in 1802.